Sahman Jihanah is a sub-district located in Jihanah District, Sana'a Governorate, Yemen. Sahman Jihanah had a population of 3258 according to the 2004 census.

References 

Sub-districts in Jihanah District